Sound City: Real to Reel is the soundtrack of the documentary film Sound City. It was officially released on March 12, 2013. The songs "Cut Me Some Slack", "From Can to Can't", "You Can't Fix This", and "Mantra" were made available on Sound Citys official YouTube channel on December 14, 2012, January 15, 2013, February 15, 2013, and March 8, 2013, respectively. Dave Grohl founded the supergroup Sound City Players with many of the musicians who appear in this movie and with whom he played live for the soundtrack; as such, Grohl is the only musician to perform on all tracks.

The soundtrack received two Grammy Awards: Best Compilation Soundtrack for Visual Media and Best Rock Song (for "Cut Me Some Slack").

Track listing

Personnel
 Credits for Sound City: Real to Reel adapted from AllMusic.

Performance
 Robert Levon Been – composer, primary artist
 Tim Commerford – composer, primary artist
 Chris Goss – composer, primary artist
 Jessy Greene – composer, primary artist
 Dave Grohl – composer, primary artist
 Taylor Hawkins – composer, primary artist
 Peter Hayes – composer, primary artist
 Joshua Homme – composer, primary artist
 Rami Jaffee – composer, primary artist
 Alain Johannes – composer, primary artist
 Jim Keltner – composer, primary artist
 Paul McCartney – composer, primary artist
 Nate Mendel – composer, primary artist
 Stevie Nicks – composer, primary artist
 Rick Nielsen – composer, primary artist
 Krist Novoselic – composer, primary artist
 Scott Reeder – composer, primary artist
 Trent Reznor – composer, primary artist
 Chris Shiflett – composer, primary artist
 Pat Smear – composer, primary artist
 Rick Springfield – composer, primary artist
 Corey Taylor – composer, primary artist
 Lee Ving – composer, primary artist
 Brad Wilk – composer, primary artist

Technical
 Sami Ansari – photography
 Matt Bissonette – composer
 James Brown – engineer, mixing
 Joe LaPorta – mastering
 Emily Lazar – mastering
 Chris Lord-Alge – mixing
 John Lousteau – engineer
 Jim Scott – engineer
 Derek Silverman – engineering support
 Butch Vig – producer

Charts

Weekly charts

Year-end charts

Certifications

References

External links
 

2013 soundtrack albums
Albums produced by Butch Vig
Dave Grohl
Documentary film soundtracks
Grammy Award for Best Compilation Soundtrack for Visual Media
Rock soundtracks
RCA Records soundtracks